The Nepela Memorial, formerly known as the Ondrej Nepela Trophy in 2013–15 & 2017 and the Ondrej Nepela Memorial, is an annual senior-level international figure skating competition. Named after 1972 Olympic champion Ondrej Nepela, the competition has been held annually since 1993. It became part of the ISU Challenger Series in the 2014–15 season.

The competition is generally held in Slovakia's capital, Bratislava, except 2009 when it was held in Piešťany. In most years, medals are awarded in four disciplines – men's singles, ladies' singles, pairs, and ice dancing.

Medalists
CS: ISU Challenger Series

Men

Ladies

Pairs

Ice dancing

References

External links
 
 Ondrej Nepela Memorial at the Slovak Figure Skating Association

 
ISU Challenger Series
International figure skating competitions hosted by Slovakia